The All-Ireland Senior Hurling Championship of 1974 was the 88th staging of Ireland's premier hurling knock-out competition.  Kilkenny won the championship, beating Limerick 3-19 to 1-13 in the final at Croke Park, Dublin.

The championship

Format

Munster Championship

First round: (1 match) This is a single match between the first two teams drawn from the province of Munster.  One team is eliminated at this stage while the winners advance to the semi-finals.

Semi-finals: (2 matches) The winner of the first round joins the other three Munster teams to make up the semi-final pairings.  Two teams are eliminated at this stage while the winners advance to the final.

Final: (1 match) The winner of the two semi-finals contest this game.  One team is eliminated at this stage while the winners advance to the All-Ireland final.

Leinster Championship

First round: (1 match) This is a single match between the first two teams drawn from the province of Leinster.  One team is eliminated at this stage while the winners advance to the semi-finals.

Semi-finals: (2 matches) The winner of the first round joins the other three Leinster teams to make up the semi-final pairings.  Two teams are eliminated at this stage while the winners advance to the final.

Final: (1 match) The winners of the two semi-finals contest this game.  One team is eliminated at this stage while the winners advance to the All-Ireland semi-final.

All-Ireland Championship

Preliminary round: (1 match) This is a single match between Galway and the winners of the All-Ireland 'B' championship.  One team is eliminated at this stage while the winners advance to the quarter-final.

Quarter-final: (1 match) This is a single match between London and the winners of the preliminary round.  One team is eliminated at this stage while the winners advance to the semi-final.

Semi-final: (1 match) This is a single match between the Leinster champions and the winners of the quarter-final.  One team is eliminated at this stage while the winners advance to the final.

Final: (1 match) The winners of the semi-final and the Munster champions contest this game.

Fixtures

Leinster Senior Hurling Championship

Munster Senior Hurling Championship

All-Ireland Senior Hurling Championship

Championship statistics

Miscellaneous
 In the Munster final Clare's Seán Stack scores a remarkable own goal for Limerick.
 The All-Ireland 'B' champions were allowed to participate in the All-Ireland series for the first time.  Kildare are the first team to benefit from this new format.
 In the All-Ireland quarter-final between Galway and London, brothers Michael and John Connolly line out for opposing teams.
 In the All-Ireland semi-final Kilkenny scored 2-32, it was one of the first times any team put more than thirty points over the bar.
 The All-Ireland final between Kilkenny and Limerick was attended by the Soviet Union ambassador to Ireland.

Top scorers

Season

Single game

References

 Corry, Eoghan, The GAA Book of Lists (Hodder Headline Ireland, 2005).
 Donegan, Des, The Complete Handbook of Gaelic Games (DBA Publications Limited, 2005).

See also

1974